Joseph Edward Brennan (born November 2, 1934) is an American Democratic Party lawyer and politician from Maine. He served as the 70th Governor of Maine from 1979 to 1987. He is a former commissioner on the Federal Maritime Commission.

Early life 
Born in 1934 in Portland, Maine, Brennan lived on Kellogg Street on Munjoy Hill. Brennan attended Cheverus High School, Boston College and the University of Maine School of Law.

Government service 
Brennan first became Cumberland County District Attorney before winning election to the Maine House of Representatives (1965–1971) and the Maine Senate (1973–1975). When first elected to the Maine House he did not own a car and hitchhiked up from Portland. His first statewide candidacy was for Governor in 1974; he lost the Democratic nomination to George J. Mitchell, whom he would later appoint to the U.S. Senate. Appointed State Attorney General in 1975, Brennan ran for governor again in 1978, winning the primary and general elections. Brennan was reelected in 1982, serving as governor from 1979 to 1987. In 1986 he ran for the U.S. House in Maine's First Congressional District and won with 53% of the vote. When he was District Attorney his Munjoy Hill was shot up with bullets landing by his infant daughter, this led Brennan to support the ban on assault style weapons in America.

After two terms in the House, Brennan ran for governor again in 1990, losing to Republican John McKernan. He ran again in 1994, losing to Independent Angus King, but placing second, ahead of Republican Susan Collins. He would face Collins in another statewide election in 1996, running for the U.S. Senate seat being vacated by Bill Cohen, a race which Collins won.

In 1999, President Bill Clinton nominated Brennan to serve as a commissioner on the Federal Maritime Commission, a small independent agency that regulates shipping between the U.S. and foreign countries. He was renominated (by President Bush) and confirmed for a second term at the FMC in 2004.

Electoral history

References

External links 

 

|-

|-

|-

|-

|-

|-

1934 births
American prosecutors
Boston College alumni
District attorneys in Cumberland County, Maine
Democratic Party members of the United States House of Representatives from Maine
Democratic Party governors of Maine
Federal Maritime Commission members
Living people
Politicians from Portland, Maine
University of Maine School of Law alumni
Cheverus High School alumni
Clinton administration personnel
George W. Bush administration personnel
Obama administration personnel